The 1993 awards were in 6 categories:  National Print, Periodicals, Radio, Regional Print, Television Documentary and Television News.

A Special Award for Best Historical Documentary was made to the Channel 4 program "Drowning by Bullets", which dealt the Paris massacre of 1961 and the events of 17 October 1961.

The overall winning entry was from BBC Radio 4, with their then South Africa correspondent Fergal Keane.

1993 Awards

See also

References

External links
 Amnesty International UK (AIUK) website
 Amnesty International UK Media Awards at the AIUK Website
 Amnesty International Website

Amnesty International
British journalism awards
Human rights awards
1993 awards in the United Kingdom